Bald Eagle is an unincorporated community in White Bear Township, Ramsey County, Minnesota, United States. The community took its name from nearby Bald Eagle Lake.

Notes

Unincorporated communities in Ramsey County, Minnesota
Unincorporated communities in Minnesota